The Mount Sinai School is a historic Rosenwald School in rural Autauga County, Alabama, northwest of Prattville.  The one-story frame building was built in 1919 to the designs of W.A. Hazel to serve the local African American community.  The money to build it was provided by the Julius Rosenwald Fund.  The school was added to the Alabama Register of Landmarks and Heritage on February 2, 2001.  It was subsequently listed on the National Register of Historic Places on November 29, 2001, as a part of The Rosenwald School Building Fund and Associated Buildings Multiple Property Submission.

See also
National Register of Historic Places listings in Autauga County, Alabama
Properties on the Alabama Register of Landmarks and Heritage in Autauga County, Alabama

References

National Register of Historic Places in Autauga County, Alabama
School buildings on the National Register of Historic Places in Alabama
Defunct schools in Alabama
School buildings completed in 1919
Properties on the Alabama Register of Landmarks and Heritage
Rosenwald schools in Alabama
1919 establishments in Alabama
Historically segregated African-American schools in Alabama